The Gifford–Inchelium ferry is a ferry across the Columbia River in Washington state.

The Colville Confederated Tribes operate this ferry across Roosevelt Lake on the upper Columbia.  It connects Inchelium, Washington, to State Route 25 across the river. The fare to ride is free. The weight limit is 40 tons.

References

External links
 Ferry information at Federal Highway Administration
 historylink.org article

Ferries of Washington (state)
Transportation in Ferry County, Washington
Transportation in Stevens County, Washington
Crossings of the Columbia River